Borislav Stefanov Abadzhiev (born October 14, 1963, in Vidin) is a retired boxer from Bulgaria, who competed for his native country at the 1988 Summer Olympics in Seoul, South Korea. There he was defeated in the first round of the Men's Light-Welterweight Division (– 63,5 kg) by Yugoslavia's  Vukašin Dobrašinović. He is best known for winning the European title in 1987.

References
 sports-reference

1963 births
Living people
Light-welterweight boxers
Olympic boxers of Bulgaria
Boxers at the 1988 Summer Olympics
People from Vidin
Bulgarian male boxers
AIBA World Boxing Championships medalists
20th-century Bulgarian people